Manandona is a town and commune in Madagascar. It belongs to the district of Antsirabe II, which is a part of Vakinankaratra Region. The population of the commune was estimated to be approximately 15,000. It is constituted by  11 fokontany  (villages), of which 2 are located in the mountains.

Geography
It is situated at 200 km south of the capital Antananarivo and about 23 km south of Antsirabe on the Route nationale 7 (Madagascar).
The Manandona river flows by this town.
Highest Point of the commune is the Mont Ibity with 2250m.

Primary and junior level secondary education are available in town. The majority 90% of the population of the commune are farmers, while an additional 10% receives their livelihood from raising livestock. The most important crops are rice and barley, while other important agricultural products are wheat and potatoes.

References 

Populated places in Vakinankaratra